Park Dong-seon is a South Korean taekwondo practitioner. 

She won a gold medal in bantamweight at the 1991 World Taekwondo Championships in Athens, by defeating Kathy Walker in the semifinal, and Döndü Şahin in the final.

References

External links

Year of birth missing (living people)
Living people
South Korean female taekwondo practitioners
World Taekwondo Championships medalists
20th-century South Korean women